Melissa Landers (born June 13, 1973) is an American writer of young-adult science fiction and fantasy novels for Disney Hyperion.  She also writes contemporary adult romance under the pseudonym Macy Beckett.

Works

Alienated trilogy
 Alienated (2014)
 Invaded (2015)
 United (2016)

Starflight duology
 Starflight (2016)
 Starfall (2017)

The Half King duology
 The Half King (2018)
 Untitled (TBA)

Sultry Springs series (as Macy Beckett)
 Sultry with a Twist (2012)
 A Shot of Sultry (2013)
 Surrender to Sultry (2013)

Dumont Bachelors series (as Macy Beckett)
 Make You Mine (2014)
 Make You Remember (2014)

References

21st-century American novelists
American romantic fiction novelists
American science fiction writers
Living people
Pseudonymous women writers
Women science fiction and fantasy writers
Women writers of young adult literature
Writers of young adult science fiction
Writers from Cincinnati
Novelists from Ohio
21st-century American women writers
1973 births
21st-century pseudonymous writers